Cantacaderinae is a subfamily of lace bugs in the family Tingidae. There are about 16 genera and at least 90 described species in Cantacaderinae.

Genera
These 16 genera belong to the subfamily Cantacaderinae:

 Afghanoderus B. Lis, 2001
 Allocader Drake, 1950
 Australocader B. Lis, 1997
 Caledoderus Guilbert, 2012
 Cantacader Amyot & Serville, 1843
 Carldrakeana Froeschner, 1968
 Ceratocader Drake, 1950
 Cyperobia Bergroth, 1927
 Minitingis Barber, 1954
 Nectocader Drake, 1928
 Pseudophatnoma Blöte, 1945
 Stenocader Drake & Hambleton, 1944
 Teratocader Drake, 1950
 † Golmonia Popov, 1989
 † Lutetiacader Wappler, 2006
 † Paleocader Froeschner, 1996

References

Further reading

 
 
 
 
 
 
 
 
 
 

Tingidae
Articles created by Qbugbot